The Berens Islands are an island group located inside western Coronation Gulf in the Kitikmeot Region, Nunavut, Canada.

Other island groups in the vicinity include the Black Berry Islands, Couper Islands, Deadman Islands, Lawford Islands, Leo Islands, and Sir Graham Moore Islands.

References

 Berens Islands at the Atlas of Canada

Islands of Coronation Gulf
Uninhabited islands of Kitikmeot Region